Waterdown Dam is an earth-fill type dam (reservoir) located on the Klipplaat River near Whittlesea, Eastern Cape, South Africa. It supplies Whittlesea and Queenstown with drinking water and was established in 1958. The hazard potential of the dam has been ranked high (3).

See also
List of reservoirs and dams in South Africa
List of rivers of South Africa

References 

 List of South African Dams from the Department of Water Affairs

Dams in South Africa
Dams completed in 1958